Brad Lavale Blackburn Jr. (born May 25, 1977) is a retired American mixed martial artist. A professional from 2000 until 2011, he fought for the UFC, Bellator, the Maximum Fighting Championship, and the Seattle Tiger Sharks of the now defunct International Fight League.

Background
At the age of 22 Blackburn began boxing but soon transitioned to MMA after being persuaded to do so by his friends who trained. A "late bloomer," Blackburn stood only 4'10 as a high school sophomore.

Mixed martial arts career

Early career
Blackburn was a contender on the now defunct IFL before signing on to the UFC. He held a record of 15 wins, 9 losses, 1 draw, and 1 no contest before joining the UFC.

Ultimate Fighting Championship
Blackburn made his UFC debut against James Giboo winning by TKO due to strikes on UFC Fight Night 14. He would later go on to defeat Ryo Chonan by unanimous decision and Edgar García by split decision.

He then fought TUF 7 winner Amir Sadollah at UFC Fight Night 20 on January 11, 2010. In this fight, Blackburn was rocked badly once in the first round and would go on to get rocked again in the third round by a knee. Blackburn survived Sadollah's attacks going on to lose by unanimous decision.

Blackburn lost to DaMarques Johnson at UFC 112, and was subsequently released from the organization.

Personal life
Blackburn has two children, a son and a daughter.

Mixed martial arts record

|-
| Loss
| align=center| 18–13–1 (1)
| Jory Erickson
| TKO (punches)
| CageSport 13
| 
| align=center| 1
| align=center| 2:50
| Tacoma, Washington, United States
| 
|-
| Loss
| align=center| 18–12–1 (1)
| Dan Hornbuckle
| Decision (unanimous)
| Bellator 25
| 
| align=center| 3
| align=center| 5:00
| Chicago, Illinois, United States
| 
|-
| Loss
| align=center| 18–11–1 (1)
| DaMarques Johnson
| TKO (body kick and punches)
| UFC 112
| 
| align=center| 3
| align=center| 2:08
| Abu Dhabi, United Arab Emirates
| 
|-
| Loss
| align=center| 18–10–1 (1)
| Amir Sadollah
| Decision (unanimous)
| UFC Fight Night: Maynard vs. Diaz
| 
| align=center| 3
| align=center| 5:00
| Fairfax, Virginia, United States
| 
|-
| Win
| align=center| 18–9–1 (1)
| Edgar García
| Decision (split)
| The Ultimate Fighter 9 Finale
| 
| align=center| 3
| align=center| 5:00
| Las Vegas, Nevada, United States
| 
|-
| Win
| align=center| 17–9–1 (1)
| Ryo Chonan
| Decision (unanimous)
| UFC 92
| 
| align=center| 3
| align=center| 5:00
| Las Vegas, Nevada, United States
| 
|-
| Win
| align=center| 16–9–1 (1)
| James Giboo
| KO (flying knee and punches)
| UFC Fight Night: Silva vs. Irvin
| 
| align=center| 2
| align=center| 2:29
| Las Vegas, Nevada, United States
| 
|-
| Win
| align=center| 15–9–1 (1)
| Delson Heleno
| KO (punch)
| IFL: New Jersey
| 
| align=center| 3
| align=center| 1:50
| East Rutherford, New Jersey, United States
| 
|-
| NC
| align=center| 14–9–1 (1)
| Travis Cox
| No Contest (illegal knee)
| IFL: 2007 Team Championship Final
| 
| align=center| 1
| align=center| 2:32
| Hollywood, Florida, United States
| 
|-
| Win
| align=center| 14–9–1
| Jay Hieron
| KO (punches)
| IFL: Everett
| 
| align=center| 1
| align=center| 0:40
| Everett, Washington, United States
| 
|-
| Loss
| align=center| 13–9–1
| Mark Miller
| Decision (unanimous)
| IFL: Moline
| 
| align=center| 3
| align=center| 4:00
| Moline, Illinois, United States
| 
|-
| Win
| align=center| 13–8–1
| Chris Wilson
| Decision (unanimous)
| IFL: Portland
| 
| align=center| 3
| align=center| 4:00
| Portland, Oregon, United States
| 
|-
| Loss
| align=center| 12–8–1
| Rory Markham
| KO (punch)
| IFL: Championship 2006
| 
| align=center| 2
| align=center| 0:23
| East Rutherford, New Jersey, United States
| 
|-
| Win
| align=center| 12–7–1
| Gustavo Machado
| Decision (split)
| IFL: Legends Championship 2006
| 
| align=center| 3
| align=center| 4:00
| Atlantic City, New Jersey, United States
| 
|-
| Loss
| align=center| 11–7–1
| Ray Perales
| Decision (split)
| XFC: Dome of Destruction 3
| 
| align=center| 3
| align=center| 5:00
| Tacoma, Washington, United States
| 
|-
| Loss
| align=center| 11–6–1
| Roger Huerta
| TKO (corner stoppage)
| IFC: Rock N' Rumble
| 
| align=center| 3
| align=center| 2:19
| Reno, Nevada, United States
| 
|-
| Loss
| align=center| 11–5–1
| Jay Jack
| Submission (forearm choke)
| ROF 15: Inferno
| 
| align=center| 3
| align=center| 3:18
| Colorado, United States
| 
|-
| Loss
| align=center| 11–4–1
| Brandon Melendez
| Decision (unanimous)
| SF 8: Justice
| 
| align=center| 3
| align=center| 5:00
| Gresham, Oregon, United States
|For the vacant SF Welterweight Championship.
|-
| Win
| align=center| 11–3–1
| Steve Legault
| KO (punch)
| APEX: Genesis
| 
| align=center| 1
| align=center| 0:14
| Montreal, Quebec, Canada
|Return to Welterweight.
|-
| Win
| align=center| 10–3–1
| Ronny Morales
| Submission (rear-naked choke)
| DB 11: DesertBrawl 11
| 
| align=center| 1
| align=center| 4:57
| Bend, Oregon, United States
|Middleweight debut.
|-
| Win
| align=center| 9–3–1
| Pat Healy
| KO (punches)
| RITR 8: Rumble in the Ring 8
| 
| align=center| 1
| align=center| 0:39
| Auburn, Washington, United States
|Lightweight bout.
|-
| Loss
| align=center| 8–3–1
| Brad Gumm
| Decision (unanimous)
| MFC 4: New Groundz
| 
| align=center| 3
| align=center| 5:00
| Calgary, Alberta, Canada
| 
|-
| Loss
| align=center| 8–2–1
| Ryan Healy
| Decision (split)
| FCFF: Rumble at the Roseland 3
| 
| align=center| 2
| align=center| 5:00
| Portland, Oregon, United States
|Lightweight bout.
|-
| Win
| align=center| 8–1–1
| Quenton Pongracz
| TKO (corner stoppage)
| MFC 3: Canadian Pride
| 
| align=center| 2
| align=center| 2:09
| Grand Prairie, Alberta, Canada
| 
|-
| Loss
| align=center| 7–1–1
| Grady Hurley
| Decision (split)
| RITR: Rumble in the Rockies
| 
| align=center| 2
| align=center| 3:00
| Denver, Colorado, United States
| 
|-
| Win
| align=center| 7–0–1
| Clayton Purvis
| TKO (head kick and punches)
| FCFF: Rumble at the Roseland 1
| 
| align=center| 1
| align=center| 1:10
| Portland, Oregon, United States
| 
|-
| Win
| align=center| 6–0–1
| Landon Showalter
| Submission (armbar)
| UFCF: Olympia Ring Challenge
| 
| align=center| 1
| align=center| 2:59
| Olympia, Washington, United States
| 
|-
| Win
| align=center| 5–0–1
| Ray Perales
| Submission (triangle choke)
| UFCF: Storm 2001
| 
| align=center| 3
| align=center| 2:04
| Kirkland, Washington, United States
| 
|-
| Win
| align=center| 4–0–1
| Matt Wurstner
| Submission (triangle choke)
| RITR 4: Rumble in the Ring 4
| 
| align=center| 1
| align=center| 2:00
| Auburn, Washington, United States
| 
|-
| Draw
| align=center| 3–0–1
| Matt Wurstner
| Draw
| RITR 3: Rumble in the Ring 3
| 
| align=center| 3
| align=center| 5:00
| Auburn, Washington, United States
|Return to Welterweight.
|-
| Win
| align=center| 3–0
| Pat Healy
| TKO (punches)
| PPKA: Muckleshoot
| 
| align=center| 1
| align=center| 0:39
| Auburn, Washington, United States
|Lightweight debut.
|-
| Win
| align=center| 2–0
| Jai Walsh
| Decision (unanimous)
| UFCF: War 2001
| 
| align=center| 3
| align=center| 5:00
| Kirkland, Washington, United States
| 
|-
| Win
| align=center| 1–0
| Jason Dickson
| TKO (punches)
| UFCF: Everett Extreme Challenge 2
| 
| align=center| 1
| align=center| 0:12
| Everett, Washington, United States
|

References

External links
 
 

1977 births
Living people
American male mixed martial artists
African-American mixed martial artists
Welterweight mixed martial artists
Mixed martial artists from Washington (state)
Ultimate Fighting Championship male fighters
21st-century African-American sportspeople
20th-century African-American sportspeople